Tikuji-Ni-Wadi is an amusement park, water park, and a resort near Mumbai and at Thane. The amusement park includes go-karts, roller coasters, giant wheels and water park. Additionally, there is a Shiva temple and marriage halls as a part of the resort. During Shivaratri, a Shiva ice replica is made. The park remains open during the rainy season. In 2013, a realistic-looking dinosaur park was started. There are several other activities and attractions such as go-karting, bumper-boats, dinosaur world, 9D adventure, aquarium and farm.

In popular culture 

Tikuji-Ni-Wadi was featured in an episode on Taarak Mehta ka ooltah chashma where the entire Gokuldham society members go to Tikuji-Ni-Wadi for a picnic.

References

External links 
 

Neighbourhoods in Thane
Tourist attractions in Thane district